M. A. Hannan (11 April 1935 – 15 June 2021) was a Bangladeshi politician who served as Member of Parliament from Mymensingh-7.

Early life
Hannan was born on 11 April 1935. He completed his undergraduate from the University of Dhaka.

Career
Hannan was elected to Parliament from Mymensingh-7 as a Jatiya Party candidate in 2014 and served till 2018. On 31 October 2016, he was charged with committing war crimes during the Bangladesh Liberation war.

Death 
Hannan died on 15 June 2021 from cancer at Bangabandhu Sheikh Mujib Medical University in Dhaka.

References

1935 births
2021 deaths
10th Jatiya Sangsad members
Jatiya Party politicians
People from Mymensingh District